Cringila is an intercity train station located in Cringila, Australia, on the South Coast railway line's Port Kembla branch. The station serves NSW TrainLink trains travelling south to Port Kembla and north to Wollongong and Sydney.

History
Though the Port Kembla district was designated as a future port and industrial area as early as 1893, satisfactory wharves were only constructed in the early 20th century. The area soon rivalled Newcastle as a centre for the state's steel industry. A hamlet of workers' cottages grew up near the steelworks, known first as "Steeltown" and, from the 1920s, Cringila. The railway from the main South Coast line to the new port was completed in July 1916, and a single-platform station followed at Cringila six years later.

Australia's entry into World War II dramatically increased its demand for steel, and the Port Kembla branch line was duplicated in 1940. A new island-platform Cringila Station, in the inter-war functionalist style, opened the following year. The dichromatic brick platform building, built to a similar plan as was used for Cronulla branch line stations, features a toilet, general waiting room, staff room, goods store, stationmaster's office, combined booking and parcels office, and ticket office. The building is considered a good example of its type, being externally intact, and has been listed on the local heritage register. The station footbridge was extended in 1958 to provide a direct connection to the adjacent BHP (now BlueScope) steelworks.

Platforms & services
Cringila has one platform with two faces. It is serviced by NSW TrainLink South Coast line services travelling between Waterfall and Thirroul to Port Kembla. One weekday morning & 4 weekend late night services go to Bondi Junction.

Transport links
Premier Illawarra operates three routes via Cringila station:
34: Wollongong to Port Kembla
51: University of Wollongong to Albion Park
53: University of Wollongong to Stockland Shellharbour

References

External links

Cringila station details Transport for New South Wales

Buildings and structures in Wollongong
Railway stations in Australia opened in 1926
Regional railway stations in New South Wales